Jeremiah Joseph Callanan, or James Joseph Callanan (1795–1829), Irish poet, was born in Cork city in 1795, died 19 September 1829 at the Hospital of São José, Lisbon, Portugal.

Life 
Callanan studied for Catholic priesthood at Maynooth College, and afterwards law at Trinity College, Dublin, where he won two prizes for his poems. He left in 1816 after determining he had no vocation.

He returned to Cork to become a tutor, though he subsequently entered Trinity College, Dublin, on an aborted idea of legal studies. With his financial resources exhausted, he enlisted in the 18th Royal Irish but was bought out by some friends.

In 1823 he was for a few months an assistant as the school of a Doctor Maginn in the city. Maginn introduced him to Blackwood's Magazine to which Callanan became a contributor, as well as to other magazines. According to the 1878 Compendium of Irish Biography.

No trace of his grave in Lisbon now remains.

Callanan also contributed translations of Irish verse to Blackwood's Magazine before traveling to Lisbon to work as a tutor in 1827. Jeremiah Callanan died in Lisbon in 1829, as he was preparing to return to Ireland.

His great-niece is Academy Award-nominated actress Pauline Collins.

Well-known poems
"The Outlaw of Loch Lene," Callanan's most well-known poem, begins with the line, "O many a day have I made good ale in the glen". It is one of the two Callanan poems included in Brendan Kennelly's The Penguin Book of Irish Verse (1970) the other one being "The Convict of Clonmel". Both are translations from the Irish.

Books of poetry
Recluse of Inchidony, and other Poems. 1830.
Poems (ed. M.F. McCarthy). 1847.
 The Poems of J. J. Callanan. A New Edition, with Biographical Introduction and Notes (c) 1992 Chadwyck-Healey

References

External links
 http://www.libraryireland.com/biography/JamesJosephCallanan.php
 
 

1795 births
1829 deaths
Irish poets
Alumni of St Patrick's College, Maynooth
Alumni of Trinity College Dublin
People from County Cork
19th-century Irish poets
Irish expatriates in Portugal